Harold Bertram Clyde Lake (1884 – September 1965) was a businessman and political figure in Newfoundland. He represented Burin as a Liberal-Conservative from 1924 to 1928 and Burin West as a Liberal from 1928 to 1932 in the Newfoundland and Labrador House of Assembly.

He was born in Fortune, the son of Philip E. Lake and Edith Purchase, and was educated in Fortune and in St. John's. He worked as a deck hand, later becoming master of his own schooner and later went into business. Lake married Sarah V. Spencer. Elected as a Liberal-Conservative in 1924, he changed allegiance to the Liberal-Progressive party in 1926. Lake served as Minister of Marine and Fishery in the Newfoundland cabinet. Following the Burin tsunami in 1929, he became chair of the Earthquake Relief Committee. Lake also served on the committee charged with investigating the explosion of the SS Viking and served as president of the Permanent Marine Disaster Fund. By 1948, his company was the largest exporter of salt fish in Newfoundland. Lake died in St. John's in 1965.

References

External links 
 

Members of the Newfoundland and Labrador House of Assembly
1884 births
1965 deaths
People from Fortune, Newfoundland and Labrador
Government ministers of the Dominion of Newfoundland